Robert Augustus Chesebrough, (January 9, 1837 – September 8, 1933) was an American chemist who discovered petroleum jelly—which he marketed as Vaseline—and founder of the Chesebrough Manufacturing Company.

Life and career 
Born in London, England, to American parents on January 9, 1837, Chesebrough was raised in New York City. He married Margaret McCredy on April 28, 1864, and they had four children.

Chesebrough began his career as a chemist clarifying kerosene from the oil of sperm whales. The discovery of petroleum in Titusville, Pennsylvania, rendered his job obsolete, so he traveled to Titusville to research what new materials might be created from the new fuel. As he was strolling around the oil field, he found out about something called rod wax, also known as petroleum jelly, a jellylike substance that was cleaned off of the pumping equipment often. Chesebrough was told it was a nuisance, except when someone had a cut or burn. If it was rubbed on an injury, then it would lessen the pain and make the injury heal quicker. He then trade-named the jelly as Vaseline. 

In 1875, he founded the Chesebrough Manufacturing Company, a leading manufacturer of personal-care products. Chesebrough patented the process of making petroleum jelly (U.S. Patent 127,568) in 1872. By 1874, stores were selling over 1,400 jars of Vaseline a day.

Chesebrough's success stemmed from a firm belief in his product. Before he began selling petroleum jelly, he tested it on his own cuts and burns. Chesebrough was still unable to sell any to drug stores until he traveled around New York demonstrating his miracle product. In front of an audience, he would burn his skin with acid or an open flame, then spread the clear jelly on his injuries while demonstrating past injuries, healed, he claimed, by his miracle product.  In reality, it doesn't heal cuts and burns, the jelly forms a layer, causing dirt to not get in (one of the leading causes of death and disease in his day were due to open wounds being infected) and trapping the moisture in. To further create demand, he gave out free samples, one of the first instances of it ever being done. 

Chesebrough opened his first factory in 1870. The first known reference to the name Vaseline is in his U.S. patent: "I, Robert Chesebrough, have invented a new and useful product from petroleum which I have named 'Vaseline…'" . The word is believed to come from German Wasser (water) +  (élaion, oil).

Chesebrough lived to be 96 years old and was such a believer in Vaseline that he claimed to have eaten a spoonful of it every day. He died at his house in Spring Lake, New Jersey.  He also, reportedly, during a serious bout of pleurisy in his mid-50s, had his nurse rub him from head to foot with Vaseline. He soon recovered, and credited his recovery to Vaseline. He is buried in Woodlawn Cemetery in the Bronx, New York City.

See also
 Whitehall Building, a building developed by Chesebrough in New York City

References

External links
 

American chemists
19th-century American inventors
1837 births
1933 deaths
People from Spring Lake, New Jersey
Burials at Woodlawn Cemetery (Bronx, New York)